"Ornithology" is a jazz standard by bebop alto saxophonist Charlie Parker and trumpeter Benny Harris.

Description

Its title is a reference to Parker's nickname, "Bird" (ornithology is the study of birds). The Charlie Parker Septet made the first recording of the tune on March 28, 1946 on the Dial label, and it was inducted into the Grammy Hall of Fame in 1989.

"Ornithology" is a contrafact – a newly created melody written over the chord progression of another song, in this case the standard "How High the Moon". It remains one of the most popular and frequently performed bebop tunes. Jazz vocalists scatting on "How High the Moon" (notably Ella Fitzgerald) often quote the melody of "Ornithology" (and vice versa). Coleman Hawkins used the first two bars of the melody in a Cozy Cole recording session dating back to November 14, 1944, in a tune called "Look Here".

Notable recordings include Bud Powell's version and the Gerry Mulligan-Chet Baker 1957 version. Babs Gonzales wrote vocalese lyrics for the tune.

"Ornithology" was prominently featured in the novel Suder by Percival Everett.

See also
List of jazz contrafacts

Footnotes

Grammy Hall of Fame Award recipients
Compositions by Charlie Parker
1940s jazz standards
Bebop jazz standards
Jazz compositions
1946 compositions
Jazz compositions in G major